Gilabert de Centelles y de Cabrera (born c.1400) was a Viceroy of Sicily and the son of  Gilabert de Centelles y de Riusech, Baron of Nules, and Elionor de Cabrera.

The Centelles were a notable and wealthy family from Valencia. He married Constanza di Ventimiglia, Countess of Collesano in Sicily.

Further reading
http://sicilyweb.com/petraliasottana/
http://www.sicilianexperience.com/history.php?codice=collesano&lingua=en
http://www.grandesp.org.uk/historia/gzas/aranda.htm

Viceroys of Sicily
Spanish untitled nobility

15th-century Aragonese nobility
People from Valencia